Birmingham Legion FC is an American professional soccer club based in Birmingham, Alabama, that competes in the USL Championship, the second division of American soccer. The team was established in August 2013 and played under the name Birmingham Hammers until 2018 and began their first professional season as Legion FC on March 10, 2019.

History
On August 9, 2017, the United Soccer League (now known as USL Championship), the Division II sanctioned league by the United States Soccer Federation, granted a team for Birmingham to begin play in the 2019 season. On January 17, 2018, the team name was revealed as Birmingham Legion FC, a reference to the historic Legion Field that opened in 1927. However, the team instead played at BBVA Field, the home of the UAB Blazers soccer program.

Oak Mountain High School graduate and Real Monarchs' star forward Chandler Hoffman signed on as the team's first player in July 2018. In August the team announced that Tom Soehn would be the first head coach of Birmingham Legion FC.

Their first professional game resulted in a 2–0 defeat against Bethlehem Steel FC on March 10, 2019.

Stadium
Legion FC played its home matches at Protective Stadium, which also serves as the Blazers' home field, which began in the 2021-22 season.

On March 15, 2021, Legion FC was forced to move its scheduled match against rival Memphis 901 to historic Legion Field because of unplayable pitch conditions at PNC Field, caused by heavy rains in the previous days. The match, dubbed "Legion at Legion," drew a club-record crowd of 10,177, which the club said was also the largest crowd ever to attend a professional soccer match in Alabama. (Legion Field's largest soccer crowd ever was a 1996 Summer Olympics match between the United States and Argentina, which also set the stadium's all-time attendance record with 83,810 fans.) Inclement weather also forced delays or cancellations in other matches.

In November 2021, the club and the University of Alabama System Board of Trustees agreed to terminate Legion FC's eight-year lease early. No reason was announced through official channels. On December 7, 2021, the club announced the Legion would play their home games at Protective Stadium starting with their 2022 season.

Club culture

Rivalries
Birmingham competes in the Southern Harm derby against rivals Memphis 901.

Sponsorship

Players and staff

Roster

Team management
{|class="wikitable"
|-
!style="background:#000000; color:white; border:2px solid #A08B58;" scope="col" colspan=2|Front office
|-

|-
!style="background:#000000; color:white; border:2px solid #A08B58;" scope="col" colspan=2|Coaching staff
|-

Team records

Year-by-year

1. Top scorer includes statistics from league matches only.

Head coaches
 Includes USLC regular season, USLC playoffs, U.S. Open Cup. Excludes friendlies.

References

External links

 

 
Soccer clubs in Alabama
Association football clubs established in 2017
2017 establishments in Alabama
USL Championship teams
Sports in Birmingham, Alabama